Middle Ring Road is a ring expressway in the city of Shanghai, China. It is the second in a series of four ring expressways around the city of Shanghai. Construction began in April 2003 on the first section of the Middle Ring Road in Yangpu District. The Middle Ring Road crosses the Huangpu River twice, using the Jungong Road Tunnel and the Shangzhong Road Tunnel. On the Pudong side, the southern section from the Shangzhong Road Tunnel to Shenjiang Road opened on 25 December 2009. Most sections of the ring road are elevated. However sections passing through Changning, Minhang District, and Yangpu District run at grade and utilizes Texas U-turn interchanges with the expressway running in a trenched underpass.

Exit list 

 Yaolong Rd (CW exit and CCW entrance)
 Shangzhong W Rd, Hongmei S Rd (CW entrance and CCW exit)
 Humin Elevated Rd
 Gudai Rd, Jiang'an Rd (CW entrance and CCW exit)
 Caobao Rd
 Wuzhong Rd
 Xianxia Rd (No CW entrance)
 Beidi Rd
 Tianshan Rd (CW entrance and CCW exit)
 Jinshajiang Rd (CW entrance and CCW exit)
 G2, G42
Tongchuan Rd Exit (outer ring)
Taopu Rd Exit & Entrance (inner ring)
Zhennan Rd Entrance (outer ring)

References 

Road transport in Shanghai